Peter and Vandy is a 2009 American romantic independent drama film starring Jason Ritter and Jess Weixler. The film was written and directed by Jay DiPietro, adapted from his own play of the same name which opened in 2002 in New York.

Plot
Peter and Vandy is a love story told out of order. Set in Manhattan,  the story shifts back and forth in time, juxtaposing Peter and Vandy's romantic beginnings with the twisted, manipulative, regular couple they become.

Cast
Jason Ritter as Peter
Jess Weixler as Vandy
Jesse L. Martin as Paul
Tracie Thoms as Marissa
Noah Bean as Andrew
Bruce Altman as Dad
Dana Eskelson as Emma
Kristina Klebe as Michelle
Zak Orth as Keith
David Rasche as Alan
Maryann Plunkett as Mom

Release
The film selected and premiered at the Sundance Film Festival on January 19, 2009.  It opened on a limited release basis in the United States in October of the same year.  It has been screened at various film festivals, including: the São Paulo International Film Festival, the Gen Art Film Festival, the AFI Dallas Film Festival, the Waterfront Film Festival, the Provincetown International Film Festival and the Tallgrass Film Festival.

A DVD of the film was released on February 9, 2010, in Region 1.

Reception

Critical response
Peter Vandy drew mixed reviews from critics. , the film holds a 65% approval rating on review aggregator Rotten Tomatoes, based on 20 reviews with an average rating of 5.55/10. The New York Times film critic Jeannette Catsoulis gave the film a mixed review, praising the film's acting, photography, and soundtrack but saying "nonlinear structure...and unrevealing dialogue too often hold us at arm's length, a puzzle to be solved without sufficient clues....Peter and Vandy is more a designer frame for actors than nourishing entertainment." By contrast, film critics Frederic and Mary Ann Brussat of the web-based Spirituality & Practice, praised the nonlinear structure, saying "the filmmaker challenges us to understand and appreciate that intimate relationships stand or fall on the basis of how couples handle trifles and everyday routines. Metromix film critic Geoff Berkshire also liked the film, saying it offers "a refreshingly clear-eyed look at relationships," comparing it to Eternal Sunshine of the Spotless Mind. "The non-linear approach relies on both subtle and obvious visual clues to keep the audience properly oriented, and enhances the narrative...DiPietro's dialogue is sharp and Ritter and Weixler credibly flesh out characters who aren't always likeable, they're just two regular people trying their best at love." Meanwhile, panning the film in Variety, critic Todd McCarthy felt "Some of the linear deck-shuffling creates small frissons, but there's no underlying tension or subtext to shore up the banal talk."

Awards
Nominated
Sundance Film Festival: Grand Jury Prize, Dramatic, Jay DiPietro; 2009.

Soundtrack

Track listing
"Abel" by The National
"Wet and Rusting" by Menomena
"Brace Yourself" by Les Savy Fav
"Air Better Come" by The Shaky Hands
"Enticing Luxuries" by Chris DiPetrio
"Overture" by Patrick Wolf
"Good Arms vs. Bad Arms" by Frightened Rabbit
"Fireworks" by Animal Collective
"For Money or Love" by The Like Young
"The Same Old Song" by 33 To Nothing
"Gospel" by The National

References

External links
 at Strand Releasing

 at Strand Releasing Channel
Jay DiPietro interview at indieWire

2009 romantic drama films
American romantic drama films
American films based on plays
Films set in the 2000s
Films set in Manhattan
Films set in New York City
Films shot in New York City
2009 directorial debut films
2009 independent films
2000s English-language films
2000s American films